Marin Vasilev Selovlev, known professionally as Marin Vasilev (Bulgarian: Марин Василев; 27 August 1867, Shumen - 14 December 1931, Sofia) was a Bulgarian sculptor and art professor.

Life and work 
After graduating from teacher training in 1886, he studied sculpture and stoneworking at a newly created vocational school in Hořice; a city known for its high-quality sandstone. He graduated in 1890 and taught at a state-run arts and crafts school in Sofia.

He was there for only about a year, when he left to study decorative and monumental sculpting at the Academy of Fine Arts, Munich. His primary instructor there was Syrius Eberle. From 1894 to 1896, he studied composition at the Academy of Fine Arts, Prague, with Josef Václav Myslbek. In 1899, he returned to Sofia, once again teaching at the arts and crafts school. Later, he moved to a position at the National Academy of Arts, where he was named a Professor in 1911. 

His works were influenced by the Munich Secession. His best known creations include the Vasil Levski Monument in Karlovo (1903), and the sculptures on the façade on the Bank of Sofia; now the DSK Bank (1914). He also created monuments to the publisher, Hristo G. Danov (1909), the revolutionary, Georgi Izmirliev (1909), the writer and diplomat, Ivan Shishmanov (1920), the Irish-born journalist, James David Bourchier (1923), and a leader of the April Uprising, Stoyan Zaimov (1929); as well as a monument in Svishtov, dedicated to those who died to free that city during the Russo-Turkish War.

He died suddenly, while teaching a class at the National Academy.

Sources
 "A memory of Prof. Dr.Sc.(Econ.) Marin Vasilev - the man who created the monument of Vasil Levski in Karlovo" by Iliana Ivanova @ Glasove
 Енциклопедия на изобразителните изкуства в България (Encyclopedia of Fine Arts in Bulgaria), Vol.1, BAN publishing, Sofia, 1980
 Енциклопедия България (Encyclopedia Bulgarica), Vol.1, BAN publishing, Sofia, 1978

External links

 Portrait of Marin Vasilev (1925), by Boris Mitov @ Facebook (Not in the public domain)
 Vasil Levski’s monument @ the Vasil Levski National Museum

1867 births
1931 deaths
Bulgarian sculptors
Academy of Fine Arts, Munich alumni
People from Shumen